Richard Ferrell may refer to:

 Richard Allan Ferrell (1926–2005), American physicist
 Richard T. Ferrell (1885–1956), American evangelist